In mathematics, Yamamoto's reciprocity law is a reciprocity law related to class numbers of quadratic number fields, introduced by .

References

Theorems in algebraic number theory